Moslehabad (also Romanized as Moşleḩābād; also known as Musalābād) is a village in Mashhad-e Miqan Rural District, in the Central District of Arak County, Markazi Province, Iran. At the 2006 census, its population was 452, in 159 families.

References 

Populated places in Arak County